The 1978 Masters (officially the 1978 Benson & Hedges Masters) was a professional non-ranking snooker tournament that took place from Monday 6 to Friday 10 February 1978 at the New London Theatre in London, England. It was the last time the Masters was held there, as the following year it moved to the Wembley Conference Centre. 10 players were invited for the tournament.

Alex Higgins won the first of his two Masters titles by defeating Cliff Thorburn.

Main draw

Final

Century breaks

None. Highest break: 88  Cliff Thorburn

References 

Masters (snooker)
Masters Snooker
Masters Snooker
Masters (snooker)
Masters (snooker)